Vivianne Pasmanter (born 24 May 1971) is a Brazilian actress.

Biography
Of Jewish origin, Vivianne is the daughter of Ricardo Pasmanter, civil engineer, and Berta Pasmanter, plastic artist (both natural of Argentina). Her first course was in Escola Hebraica de Teatro, where she met Caco Ciocler, who would later play opposite professionally. Within its formation are the Escola de Arte Dramática, courses with Antunes Filho and Miriam Mehler, among others.

Career
She began her career doing commercials, like the jeans Staroup. One of her first jobs was as an actress in a cameo role as a fairy in one of the episodes of the painting "Senta que lá vem história...", the program Rá-Tim-Bum TV Cultura in 1990. But her first big career opportunity that occurred in 1991 when she moved to the city of Rio de Janeiro in order to play in her first novel, the villain Débora in the novel Felicidade, written by Manoel Carlos. Still with the same author would another villain weight, Laura of Por Amor.

In her career collecting roles in soap operas especially, as Malu of Mulheres de Areia, the Irene of A Próxima Vítima, the Lavínia of Anjo de Mim, the Elisabete of Andando nas Nuvens and Maria João of Uga-Uga. After six years of sporadic participation, returned to the screen in Páginas da Vida, as the photographer Isabel. Later played Regeane Cordeiro, one of the protagonists of the novel Tempos Modernos.

Her career is not only limited to television, theater and film is also, like the play Tartufo and movie Quase um Tango..., which won her the award Kikito for best actress in Festival de Gramado.

On her 25-year career in 2016, Vivianne took stock: "I had the opportunity to make very different, unique and striking characters. This diversity challenged me and stimulated me as an actress, but also brought a lot of personal learning. by a character". In 2017, living the priceless Germana in Novo Mundo, debut novel by Alessandro Marson and Thereza Falcão, whose transformation into an ugly woman left the actress unrecognizable. Her performance is so praised and so successful that the character eventually steals the scene, and together with Ingrid Guimarães and Letícia Colin were considered the great feminine highlights of the novel.

Personal life
She married entrepreneur Gilberto Zaborowsky in 2001, with whom she has a son, Eduardo, and a daughter, Lara. They divorced in 2008.

Filmography

TV

Cinema

Theater

References

External links

1971 births
Living people
Actresses from São Paulo
Brazilian telenovela actresses
Brazilian film actresses
Brazilian stage actresses
Brazilian people of Argentine descent
Brazilian people of Jewish descent